Jevnaker is a municipality in Viken county, Norway.  The administrative centre of the municipality is the village of Jevnaker with a population of 4,302.

The parish of Jævnaker was established as a municipality on 1 January 1838 (see formannskapsdistrikt). The area of Lunner was separated from the municipality of Jevnaker on 1 January 1898 to form a municipality of its own. From 1 January 2020 the municipality belongs to Viken county, it was Oppland before that.

The municipality is (together with Gran and Lunner) a part of the Hadeland traditional region. The Hadeland region has a population of about 30,000. The region spreads over a large area including several villages and towns.

Name and coat-of-arms
The municipality (originally the parish) is named after the old Jevnaker farm (Old Norse: Jafnakr), since the first church was built here. The first element is jafn which means "even" or "flat" and the last element is akr which means "field" or "acre".  Prior to 1889, the name was written "Jævnaker".

The coat-of-arms is from modern times, granted in 1983.  The arms show three silver-colored glasses, since glassblowing has been a long tradition and industry in the municipality (see Hadeland Glassverk). The red colour of the background was also chosen as the colour of the glass when hot.

Geography

Jevnaker is situated at the southern end of the Randsfjorden. The municipality is bordered to the north by the municipality of Gran, to the east by Lunner, and to the southwest by Ringerike (in Buskerud county).

The municipality lies in the extreme south of Oppland county.

Economy
Jevnaker is home to Hadeland Glassverk, an old glassblowing factory with over 600,000 visitors each year, ranking it as the third most popular tourist destination in Norway.

The Kistefos Træsliberi, an industrial museum with a very impressive Art collection, is also located in Jevnaker

Demographics

In 2015, 96 inhabitants had Polish parents and/or were Polish (themselves); 66 had Lithuanian parents and/or were Lithuanian.

Notable people 
 Ulrik Frederik Lange (1808 in Jevnaker – 1878) educator and Mayor of Lillehammer, 1850's & 60's
 Carl M. Rynning-Tønnesen (1924 in Jevnaker – 2013) police chief of Kristiansand 1979 to 1992
 Kjell Knudsen (born 1931 in Jevnaker) civil servant and county mayor of Akershus, 1969 to 1975
 Tor Bomann-Larsen (born 1951 in Jevnaker) a children's writer, non-fiction writer and novelist
 Jonas Rønning (born 1970 in Jevnaker) a Norwegian comedian, actor and cabaret artist

References

External links

Municipal fact sheet from Statistics Norway

Official website 
Gallery Roenland 

 
Municipalities of Oppland
Municipalities of Viken (county)
Villages in Oppland
Villages in Viken (county)
Hadeland